Ali Turan (born 6 September 1983) is a Turkish footballer who most recently played for Konyaspor.

Club career
Turan began his professional career with Kayserispor, and went on loan to Kayseri Erciyesspor during the 2006–07 Super Lig season. He was one of the young players of Kayserispor whom former coach Ertuğrul Sağlam trusted and gave the opportunity to play past seasons. He's regarded as a promising center back.

From next season Turan would be playing for Galatasaray as he has signed a pre-contract. Kayserispor was very angry with Turan's decision so they have lowered him to their reserve team and removed him from captain. Now he playing for Antalyaspor
Ali Turan signed a 3-year deal with Antalyaspor after getting released from Galatasaray in January 2011.

Career statistics

Honours 
Kayserispor
Turkish Cup: 2008

Konyaspor
Turkish Cup: 2016–17
Turkish Super Cup: 2017

References

External links
Statistics at TFF.org 
Soccerway Profile

1983 births
Living people
People from Kayseri
Turkish footballers
Turkey B international footballers
Turkey under-21 international footballers
Süper Lig players
Kayserispor footballers
Kayseri Erciyesspor footballers
Galatasaray S.K. footballers
Turkey youth international footballers
Members of the 24th Parliament of Turkey
Association football defenders